Guizhou University of Traditional Chinese Medicine is a public university based in Guiyang, the capital of Guizhou province in China.

History 
The university was established in 1965 as the Guiyang College of Traditional Chinese Medicine.  It covers  divided among two campuses, the North Campus and South Campus. In 2018, it was renamed Guizhou University of Traditional Chinese Medicine.

Administration

Schools and departments 
The university is organised into twelve departments and schools.

The Law Department
The Applied Psychology Department
The Preclinical Medicine Department
The Pharmacy Department
Department of Acupuncture Moxibustion and Massage
Department of Nursing
Department of Foreign Languages
The Specialty of Orthopedics and Traumatology
The Integrated Chinese and Western Clinical Medicine
The Experimental Animal Research Institute
Department of Social Sciences
Department of Physical Education
Department of Medical Humanities
First Department of Clinical Medicine
Second Department of Clinical Medicine

References

External links 
 

Education in Guizhou
Universities and colleges in Guizhou
Educational institutions established in 1965
1965 establishments in China